Im Yoon-ah (born May 30, 1990), known mononymously as Yoona, is a South Korean singer and actress. After training for five years, she debuted as a member of girl group Girls' Generation (and later its subgroup Girls' Generation-Oh!GG) in August 2007, which went on to become one of the best-selling artists in South Korea and one of South Korea's most popular girl groups worldwide. Apart from her group's activities, Yoona has participated in various television dramas, notably You Are My Destiny (2008), which marked her career breakthrough and earned her the Best New Actress awards at the 23rd KBS Drama Awards and the 45th Baeksang Arts Awards.

Yoona has since achieved further public attention and acting acclaim with a variety of role-types in Love Rain (2012), Prime Minister & I (2013), The K2 (2016), The King in Love (2017), Hush (2020–21) and Big Mouth (2022). Her film work includes Confidential Assignment (2017), Exit (2019), her first leading role, and Confidential Assignment 2 (2022), all of which are among the highest-grossing films in South Korea.

On May 30, 2019, Yoona released of her debut extended play A Walk to Remember, charting at number three on South Korea's Gaon Album Chart.

The success of Yoona's music and acting careers have led her to various CF deals, notably long-term collaborator Innisfree, and have established her as a top idol-actress of Hallyu.

Life and career

1990–2007: Early life and career beginnings

Yoona was born on May 30, 1990 in Yeongdeungpo-gu of Seoul, South Korea. Her family consists of her father and an older sister by five years.

In 2002, she was cast in the SM Saturday Open Casting Audition and spent five years "doing nothing but constant training" in singing, dancing and acting. Prior to debuting, Yoona was introduced to the public through various appearances in music videos and commercials; she first appeared in TVXQ's "Magic Castle" music video in December 2004. She made her official debut as a member of Girls' Generation in August 2007, becoming the "center" of the group.

2008–2016: Acting career
Apart from Girls' Generation's activities, Yoona has acted in several television dramas. Her acting career began in 2007 with a minor role in MBC's drama Two Outs in the Ninth Inning. She then appeared in MBC's Woman of Matchless Beauty (2008), and was complimented by veteran actress Bae Jong-ok for her cameo performance.

In May 2008, Yoona landed her first leading role in KBS's drama You Are My Destiny, playing the character Jang Sae-byuk. The drama achieved viewer ratings of up to 41.5%, and Yoona received wider public recognition. She considered the role a turning point in her career, and won two "Best New Actress" awards at the 2008 KBS Drama Awards and 45th Baeksang Arts Awards. In 2009, Yoona was cast in MBC's drama Cinderella Man along with Kwon Sang-woo.

In March 2012, Yoona was cast in a lead role alongside Jang Geun Suk in KBS2's drama Love Rain, a fantasy drama about fate where the offspring of an ill-fated couple who met in the 1970s, meet and fall in love with each other in the modern era. Yoona played two characters: Yun-hee of the 70s and Ha-na of modern times. Although the drama scored low domestic viewership and was criticized for its failure to relate to the viewers, Yoona's acting received positive reviews. Yoon Ga-ee of OSEN wrote: "The speed at which her acting is improving is blinding. She has matured to the point where you want to ask, 'When did her acting get so good?' The criticism that trailed behind her during Cinderella Man is now nowhere to be found." Choi In-kyung of Hankook Ilbo said her acting was continuously improving and "Yoona is completely immersed in her character and has now become 'Hana' herself." The drama garnered much positive overseas interest and was sold to Japan for $10 million, the second highest price for a KBS drama at the time, partly due to Yoona's popularity.

In December 2013, Yoona starred alongside Lee Beom-soo in KBS2's romantic comedy drama Prime Minister & I. Loosely based on the musical film The Sound of Music, Yoona played Nam Da-jung, a young and stubborn reporter who falls in love with the prime minister. The drama received low ratings but Yoona's performance was praised and she won an Excellence Award at the 2013 KBS Drama Awards for the role.

In March 2016, Yoona released her first solo single “Deoksugung Stonewall Walkway”, a collaboration with the South Korean indie group 10cm, as part of SM Station. The urban-pop song peaked at number 24 on Gaon Digital Chart. Fuse described it as "breezy and easy-listening" and complimented how "lovely" Yoona delivered the song.

In April 2016, Yoona was cast in her debut Chinese drama God of War, Zhao Yun, based on the Chinese novel Romance of the Three Kingdoms. She played dual roles–one falls in love with the male lead character but later finds out he killed her father while the other is skilled in martial arts. The drama's viewership ratings peaked at more than 2%, which was described to be "a huge success" relative to China's large population. It also recorded more than 10 billion hits through various online videos sites, reflecting Yoona's popularity in China. Following the success, in August 2016, Yoona released a Chinese digital mini-album titled Blossom, which contains her renditions of well-known Mandarin songs.

2016–present: Transitioning roles and solo debut

In September 2016, Yoona starred in tvN's action thriller The K2. Tired of being typecast with a candy-like image and having always been burdened by the idol-actress prejudice, Yoona cast away the public perception and focused on the role as her "personal challenge." Her effort gained positive viewers' recognition, and earned her acting acclaim from critics.

In January 2017, Yoona made her film debut in action film, Confidential Assignment. Yoona's performance was well-received, and she won several awards such as the AFA Next Generation Award at the Asian Film Awards and the Newcomer Award at the Korean Film Shining Star Awards.
She then starred in MBC's historical drama The King in Love, an adaptation of the novel of the same name by Kim Yi-ryung. In September 2017, Yoona released her second solo single "When The Wind Blows" as part of SM Station.

In 2018, Yoona joined the second season of Hyori's Homestay as a new helper. She released her third solo single "To You" at the conclusion of the variety show. In August 2018, a Girls' Generation subgroup named Oh!GG was formed with Yoona alongside the four other members who had decided to renew their contracts with SM entertainment; the group released the single "Lil’ Touch".

To celebrate her 29th birthday, Yoona released her debut extended play A Walk to Remember on May 30, 2019. The EP became the fastest-selling album in its first 24 hours by a female soloist. In July of the same year, Yoona starred in the disaster action film Exit alongside Jo Jung-suk. It became the most popular movie of the summer and one of the highest-grossing films in South Korea by attracting over nine million viewers. Her first leading role earned her several wins and nominations, including her first Blue Dragon and Chunsa Film Art Awards Best Actress nominations, and a Best Actress win at the 1st Asan Chungmugong International Action Film Festival.

At the end of 2020, Yoona returned to the small screen in JTBC's office drama Hush, where she played an intern reporter. In 2021, Yoona starred in Lee Jang-hoon's romantic drama film Miracle: Letters to the President and also appeared in A Year-End Medley, a romantic comedy film by Kwak Jae-yong. The former earned her a second Blue Dragon Best Actress nomination and her first Baeksang Best Actress nomination.

In 2022, she was cast in the TV series Big Mouth as Lee Jong Suk's wife. She also reprised her role in the action-comedy sequel, Confidential Assignment 2: International, which subsequently also became one of the highest-grossing films in South Korea like its predecessor. She drew acclaim for both performances, the latter giving her first Best Supporting Actress award at the 58th Grand Bell Awards.

Other ventures

Endorsements

Yoona has been called a "CF Queen" due to her several television commercial films, and has been a spokesperson for various brands. CNN credited her as "one of the household names in the Asia-Pacific region" which has helped Korean beauty brands become popular in China. In 2010, she became the first idol to endorse S-Oil, a large South Korean petroleum and refinery company. In 2012, she appeared in at least 20 commercials and was ranked fifth among celebrities with the most commercial appearances by TVCF, South Korea's largest advertisement information site. In 2013, she became the first overseas endorser for Alcon Taiwan. From 2009 to 2020, Yoona was a long-term spokesperson for Amore Pacific's comestic brand Innisfree. Other major endorsements included Michael Kors, in which she became the brand's first ambassador in Korea, Asia-Pacific spokesperson for luxury cosmetics brand Estée Lauder, Danish jewellery brand Pandora, South Korean insurance DB Insurance, Tous Les Jours, Crocs and Lee Jeans. In October 2021, she became the first person to be selected as global ambassador for Italian luxury fashion brand Miu Miu. In January 2023, Yoona became the global face of the Miu Miu's 2023 Spring Summer collection campaign, alongside Emma Corrin, Kendall Jenner, Quintessa Swindell, Karolin Wolter and more.

Ambassadorship
In 2012, Yoona was appointed as the Honorary Ambassador of Jung-gu, Seoul. In 2014, Yoona was appointed as ambassador for UNICEF's campaign, “UNIHERO”, which aims to invite people to become heroes for the less fortunate children all around the globe. In 2015, Yoona was named promotional ambassadors for the National Tax Service. She has also received presidential commendation for having paid her taxes faithfully. In 2016, Yoona participated in Crocs' "Come As You Are" campaign as one of the global ambassadors. In 2018, Yoona was appointed as a safety ambassador for the Central Council for Safe Culture Campaign, held to pledge safety measures and eradication of dangerous activities such as speeding and illegal parking that prevents the entry of fire trucks.

In 2019, Yoona became the first female celebrity to be appointed as an ambassador by the Ministry of Culture, Sports and Tourism and the Korea Tourism Organization. Starting September 2019, an advertisement campaign 'Imagine Your Korea' was launched to improve Korean tourism awareness and attract more foreign tourists. The advertisements were displayed in countries such as China, Japan, Thailand, the Philippines, Vietnam and Malaysia. They will also be displayed in Times Square every day until January 2021.

Philanthropy
Over the years, Yoona has donated to various charities for causes such as social welfare and medical aid during the COVID-19 pandemic. She is a member of the 'Honor Society' of the Community Chest of Korea.

Impact
As a member of Girls' Generation and a successful actress, Yoona has been hailed as a top idol-actress and a prominent South Korean figure. Having appeared in CFs even before her Girls' Generation debut, the success of Yoona's music and acting careers have led her to individually endorsing almost 40 brands internationally, notably long-time collaborator Innisfree, including ten in 2019 alone. In 2016, Yoona was listed by Forbes magazine as one of Asia's "30 under 30" most influential celebrities in the category of entertainment and sports. Yoona has also distinguished herself by being selected to host for many year-end galas. In particular, she has been the MC of the Gayo Daejejeon for eight consecutive years.

Personal life
Yoona graduated from Daeyoung High School in 2009. She went on to major in theater studies and graduated from Dongguk University in February 2015, receiving a lifetime achievement award at the graduation ceremony. Her fellow Girls' Generation member, Seohyun, attended the same university. She was also chosen as an ambassador for the university in 2014, alongside Apink's Naeun and actress Park Ha-sun.

Discography

Extended plays

Singles

Filmography

Awards and nominations

Notes

References

External links

  
 
 

1990 births
Living people
Singers from Seoul
21st-century South Korean singers
21st-century South Korean actresses
Actresses from Seoul
Dongguk University alumni
Girls' Generation members
Japanese-language singers of South Korea
Mandarin-language singers of South Korea
SM Entertainment artists
South Korean women pop singers
South Korean film actresses
South Korean female idols
South Korean television actresses
21st-century South Korean women singers